Golden Bear Products Ltd. is a British toy manufacturing company that was formed in 1979 by John Hales and Christine Nicholls. Golden Bear operates from its headquarters in Telford, Shropshire and opened an office in Hong Kong in 2001.

Products
The company has sold a broad range of licensed and branded products including Thomas and Friends, My 1st JCB, Charlie and Lola, Pingu, Noddy, Peppa Pig, Brum, Bob the Builder, Cars, Dora the Explorer, Hana's Helpline, Ben and Holly's Little Kingdom, Sooty and Teletubbies. They also produce new properties, like Bush Baby World.

"My First Thomas & Friends" is a range of chunky plastic toys. The range started in c.1994, and was advertised for young infants who enjoyed the series. The models were safe for younger fans to play with, and included most of the major and minor characters from the TV Series.

The company also acquired the rights to sell the London 2012 Olympic and Paralympic mascots Wenlock and Mandeville. In 2012 the company also launched a range of pre school vehicles under the brand name Go MINI which was officially licensed by BMW MINI. They also launched a range of Something Special toys featuring the popular BBC character Mr Tumble.

Buying direct from Golden Bear
In 2008, Golden Bear launched a website (www.goldenbeartoys.com) where consumers can buy directly from Golden Bear online. This website features the whole catalogue, plus Special Offers, competitions and activities.

Current brands and products
 Bing related products (2019–present)
 Hey Duggee related products (2015–present)
 In the Night Garden... related products
 JCB related products
 Love Monster related products (2020–present) 
 Something Special Related Products
 Sassimals
 Windy Bums
 Twirlywoos related products (2015–present)

Historic brands and products

 Brum related products
 Charlie and Lola related products
 Chuggington related products
 Driver Dan's Story Train related products (2011)
 Pingu related products
 Teletubbies related products
 Thomas & Friends related products (now owned by Mattel)
 Woolly and Tig related products

External links
Golden Bear Toys corporate website

References 

Toy companies of the United Kingdom
Toy companies established in 1979
Companies based in Shropshire
1979 establishments in England